Serra de Santa Bárbara is the peak of an inactive volcano in the western part of the island of Terceira, Azores, Portugal. At  elevation, it is the highest point of the island. It is named after the village located on the coast to the south, Santa Bárbara in the municipality of Angra do Heroísmo.

The peak lies on the south rim of the Santa Barbara Caldera which is approximately one kilometer wide, having two smaller peaks in the center of the caldera.  The upper slopes and the floor of the caldera are covered by holly and juniper forests, almost all of which are protected in the Nature Reserve of Serra de Santa Barbara e dos Mistérios Negros.

In 1761 a portion of the volcano erupted, and according to local religious lore, the villagers took a holy relic up to the erupting lava, and the lava stopped.

Notes and references

Angra do Heroísmo
Mountain ranges of Portugal
Inactive volcanoes